Departures is an American digital lifestyle magazine with a focus on luxury and travel for holders of American Express platinum and centurion cards. It was formerly a print magazine published by Meredith Corporation under an arrangement with American Express. On March 25, 2021, it was announced that Departures would cease print publication, and, according to an American Express statement, transition "to a new digital-first editorial platform." American Express announced that it was ending its publishing deal with Meredith.

The longtime editor-in-chief was Richard David Story, who had previously worked at Vogue and Esquire. He spent 17 years at Departures before leaving in 2017. "Richard had the essential ingredient required of a great editor – massive curiosity", said Graydon Carter, the longtime editor of Vanity Fair. "It carried him through an enviable run at Departures." (Story died on March 5, 2021, at age 68.) In May 2017, Jeffries Blackerby was named editor-in-chief. From 2002 to 2006, he had been senior editor at Departures before going on to positions at the New York Times and Vogue. In March 2021, with the suspension of the print edition, Blackerby exited the company.

Departures had been purchased from American Express Publishing by Time Inc. on October 1, 2013, along with sister publication Travel + Leisure. In 2017, Meredith purchased Time Inc.'s magazines, including Departures, in a $2.8 billion deal.

At its peak, Departures was said to generate an estimated $50 million a year in revenue. It is known for its colorful layouts and photography, travel essays, and city guides.

International edition 

Outside of the United States, a separate version of Departures is published by a different editorial team. Like the American edition, Departures International is owned by American Express; however, it is published by JI Experience GmbH. The editor-in-chief is Christian Schwalbach.

References

External links
 
 International edition website

American Express
Lifestyle magazines published in the United States
Magazines established in 1984
Tourism magazines
Magazines published in New York City
Magazines formerly owned by Meredith Corporation
1984 establishments in the United States